The Kodak PixPro AZ521 is a superzoom bridge camera under the Kodak brand.

Reviews
ePhotozine, in their review of the camera, wrote that they were "pleasantly surprised", and that the camera "packs a lot of features and takes decent pictures for a very fair price".

See also
 Kodak PixPro S1

References

Superzoom cameras
Cameras introduced in 2013